Afrostyrax is a genus of plant in family Huaceae. It contains the following species:
 Afrostyrax kamerunensis G.Perkins & Gilg
 Afrostyrax lepidophyllus Mildbr.
 Afrostyrax macranthus Mildbr.

References

Huaceae
Oxalidales genera
Taxonomy articles created by Polbot